The Tomb of Mary of Burgundy is a funeral monument completed in 1501 built to cover the grave of Mary of Burgundy in the Church of Our Lady, Bruges. Mary died in March 1482 aged 25, following injuries sustained at a hunting accident a number of weeks earlier.

Mary was born in 1457 as the only child of Charles and Isabella of Bourbon (1434-1465). On her father's death at the Battle of Nancy, she became the last of the House of Valois-Burgundy and inherited the Duchy of Burgundy, making her the then richest woman in Europe.

The tomb was commissioned by her husband Maximilian of Austria and their eldest child Philip the Fair, based on a rough design specified during her deathbed wishes. A number of designers, sculptors and stonemasons, perhaps headed by Renier van Thienen, were involved in its creation; records suggest contributions by Jan Borman, Pieter de Backere and Jehan Hervy, although the chronology and the extent of their individual work is unknown.

Death of Mary of Burgundy

Mary was born in 1457 as the only child of Charles the Bold (b. 1477) and Isabella of Bourbon (d. 1465). Mary was eight years old when her mother died. She was a well recognised patron of the arts and aged 18 commissioned a tomb for her mother (which she had significant input into Isabella's tomb, it was still incomplete by the time of her own early death). She oversaw and approved many elements of its design—as she later did with the tomb for her uncle Jacques de Bourbon.

In order to counter the French king Louis XI's attempts to bring Burgundy under his control, Charles (who had spent most of his life battling Louis)  betrothed Mary to Maximilian of Austria in 1476. They married the following year when they were both in their early teens. Although marriage arranged, the two developed a romantic bond and were faithful to each other. As Charles had planned, their union allowed his faily to retain parts of the Burgundian lands, although the inheritance line changed  from the House of Valois to the House of Habsburg. Charles was killed at the Battle of Nancy in January 1477 while fighting against Louis XI, making her, at 19 years, the sole inheritor of the Duchy of Burgundy and the last of the House of Valois-Burgundy.

Mary was falconing on a hunt with Maximilian and knights of the court in a forest outside Bruges when her horse fell over and threw her in a ditch, before landed on top of her. Having sustained massive internal injures and a broken back, she died several days later on 27 March, having dictated a will and testament that outlined her wishes for a monument which she requested that she would be buried —according to an 1844 reproduction of the will—  "honorably according to her station" and that a "large and beautiful" image of the Virgin was placed "before this sepulcher or sarcophagus." 

As per her dying wishes, she was buried under the choir of the Church of Our Lady, Bruges on 3 April 1482. Bruges was then at the height of its commercial and cultural importance and was the birthplace of her son, while it was important to Mary that the church bore her own namesake. Although the court was near bankrupt at the time, Maximilian threw a lavish ceremony, partly funded by melting down and selling off their cutlery and silverware. Due to these financial constraints, work of Mary's tomb did not begin until at least September 1488.

Commission and attribution

Mary's dying wishes were carried out under the patronage of her husband and her eldest son Philip the Fair (d. 1506). Although the circumstances of the build was not well documented, it known that from archives dated 1488 the project was overseen by the executor of her will, Thibault Barradot (d. 1503), a high ranking financier who had been her Maître de la Chambre des Denier (Master of Coins), and was appointed to the project almost immediately after her death.

Barradot had difficultly raising funds for the monument due to political and legal complications around the distribution of Mary's wealth to her two surviving children. He first had to pay off substantial debts to her creditors, which he funded via rents and taxes from her estates. Eventually he was able to purchase the marble from the stone merchant Martin de Bouge for 30 pounds and hire a number of well known designers and sculptors. Records indicate that stonemasons were working on the monument c. July 1493 when Renier van Thienen was formally contracted to oversee the initial build and to hire masons and stonecutters to begin work on the base, although he may have been involved in it planning since 1491. Although the historical record is scant as to the sequence and specific attributions of individual artists, art historians generally attribute a group that includes  Jan Borman Pieter de Backere and Jehan Hervy, although the chronology and the extent of their individual contributions is uncertain.

Description

Unlike the tombs of her ancestors reaching back to that of Philip the Bold (d. 1404) and his son John the Fearless (d. 1419), Mary's is made from metal rather than alabaster and marble, and lacks the characteristic mourners ("weepers" or "pleurants") found on the sides of most Burgundian tombs, a deliberate choice made to instead honour both sides of her family via heraldry.

The monument consists of Mary's gilt-bronze effigy placed over a hollow rectangular tomb made of black stone. The tomb's long-sides are heavily decorated with gilt-bronze branches of her family tree, and hanging enameled shields displaying the coats of arms of her ancestors. The short-side below her head contains her own coats of arms.

Her effigy is recumbent (that is lying flat). Her head rests on a pillow, and her hands are joined and raised in prayer.

Her epitaph appears in a long scroll that has angels on either side. It is written in gothic script and reads "Marie de Bourgongne Archiduchesse daustrice fille Charles duc de Bourgongne et de Ysabeau de Bourbon."

References

Sources

 Armstrong, Charles Arthur John. "The Burgundian Netherlands, 1477-1521", in: Potter, George Richard (ed), The New Cambridge Modern History volume I. Cambridge: Cambridge University Press, 1957. 
 Arnade, Peter (ed). "Rereading Huizinga: Autumn of the Middle Ages, a Century Later". Amsterdam: Amsterdam University Press, 2019. 
 Mikolic, Amanda. "Fashionable Mourners: Bronze Statuettes from the Rijksmuseum" (exhibition catalogue). Cleveland, OH: Cleveland Museum of Art, 2017
 Nash, Susie. Northern Renaissance art. Oxford: Oxford University Press, 2008. 
 Panofsky, Ervin. Tomb Sculpture. London: Harry Abrams, 1964. 
 Pegues, Emily; Smith, Dylan. "New Technical Research on the Tomb of Mary of Burgundy (Audio doc)". National Gallery of Art, 2018. Retrieved 13 February 2023.
 Roberts, Ann. "The Chronology and Political Significance of the Tomb of Mary of Burgundy". The Art Bulletin, volume 71, nr. 3, 1989. 
 Scholten, Frits. "Isabella’s Weepers: Ten Statues from a Burgundian Tomb"'. Amsterdam: Rijksmuseum, 2007. 
 Vaughan, Richard; Paravicini, Werner. Charles the Bold: The Last Valois Duke of Burgundy. London: Barnes & Noble, 1973. 

1500s sculptures
International Gothic
Tomb Sculptures from the Court of Burgundy